Zero in condotta ("Zero for Conduct") is a 1983 Italian teen comedy film directed by Giuliano Carnimeo and starring Angelo Maggi and Elena Sofia Ricci.

Plot
Sixties. Among the students of the last year of a classical high school there is Renato, a young student, who has always been in love and not reciprocated by his classmate Manuela. Together with the two inseparable friends, taking advantage of the absence of his parents, he organizes a party in his house with Manuela and two other classmates. Suspended from school for breaking into the women's locker room, Renato decides to leave for Sweden thinking of finding easy sexual adventures. On the train he meets a lady on his way to Florence, who confesses to him that she is looking for adventures with young boys to take revenge on her husband, who has cheated on her with an eighteen year old. As she greets him, the lady gives him a note with her telephone number and invites him to visit her. The boy returns to Rome and, after discovering that the lady on the train is the wife of the mathematics teacher, he decides to go back to court Manuela.

Cast 
 Angelo Maggi as Renato Petrocelli aka Speedy Gonzales 
Elena Sofia Ricci as Manuela
 Orsetta Gregoretti  as Cristina Cavatocci  aka Chiappa Tosta 
 Tiziana Altieri 	as Maria Grazia Turri  aka Diomela 
 Sebastiano Somma as Giuseppe La Magna aka  Cassiodoro 
 Giacomo Rosselli as Gino Mezzalega
 Giorgio Vignali as Riccardo Zanetti  aka Dumbo
 Ornella Pacelli  as Angela Gaspari  aka Acquasantiera 
Antonella Lualdi as  Milena 
 Annabella Schiavone as Renato's Mother 
 Gianfranco Barra 	as Professor Giandomenico Gelmetti  aka Palle Secche 
Luca Sportelli as   The Head Teacher  aka Culandrone  
Sophia Lombardo as Teacher
Ennio Antonelli as Varechina

See also 
 List of Italian films of 1983

References

External links

Italian teen comedy films
1980s teen comedy films
Films directed by Giuliano Carnimeo
1980s Italian-language films
1983 comedy films
1983 films
1980s Italian films